Adrian Ioan Sălăgeanu (born 9 April 1983 in Carei, Romania) is a Romanian football player.

Career

Oțelul Galați 

He played 4 years for Oțelul Galați being a key player in the 11/12 season where he won his first league title.

FC Vaslui 
On 14 June 2012 he signed a 3-year deal with FC Vaslui.

International career 

Sălăgeanu made his debut for the Romania national team at the age of 27 in February 2011 in a friendly game against Cyprus.

Honours

Oțelul Galați 

Liga I
 Winner: 2010–11
Supercupa României
 Winner: 2011

External links

 

1983 births
Living people
Romanian footballers
Association football midfielders
Liga I players
Liga II players
ACF Gloria Bistrița players
CS Mioveni players
FC Vaslui players
FC Olimpia Satu Mare players
ASC Oțelul Galați players
Romania international footballers